Khaldoun Baghdadi is a prominent Palestinian-American attorney and former chairman of the San Francisco Human Rights Commission. He was born in Amman, Jordan, but grew up in Orange County, California.

Baghdadi received his undergraduate degree from the University of California Irvine, and also received a fellowship to study at Bir Zeit University, in Ramallah, West Bank. He later earned his law degree from UC Hastings College of the Law, in 1997.

He is currently a partner with Walkup, Melodia, Kelly, and Schoenberger in San Francisco, California. In 2003, he was appointed to the San Francisco Human Rights Commission, and in 2006 was elected its chairman, becoming the first Palestinian-American to hold the post.

References
 Profile of Khaldoun Baghdadi at the Institute for Middle East Understanding

Living people
American people of Palestinian descent
1973 births
Birzeit University alumni
University of California, Irvine alumni
University of California, Hastings College of the Law alumni
People from Amman